Stephen "Steve" Rucker (born 2 March 1954) is an American musician and drummer who served as the drummer with many artists. His biggest and well known act was the Bee Gees.  With the Bee Gees band, he appeared on The Tonight Show, Late Night with David Letterman, Oprah Winfrey, The Rosie O'Donnell Show, the Rock and Roll Hall of Fame induction and a Royal Variety Performance.  Rucker appears on the Bee Gees' One Night Only recording and DVD. He is currently the Drumset Studies director of the University of Miami's Frost School of Music.

Early life
Originally from Charlotte, North Carolina, Rucker attended Berklee College of Music in Boston, and holds an Undergraduate Degree in Studio Music and Jazz and a master's degree in Jazz Performance from the University of Miami Frost School of Music.

From September 1974 until May 1975, Rucker toured with the Charlotte NC based band, Sugarcreek.  During this period he became the musical arranger for the seven-piece horn band, and wrote and recorded their first single, "Runnin' Out of Time".

Florida
Rucker moved to Miami, Florida in 1976.  Soon after, he was voted "Best Jazz Performer" and "Most Versatile Artist" in South Florida polls. In the early 1980s, Rucker was a member of the Ross-Levine band, a ground-breaking jazz-fusion group. In addition to numerous appearances with them, he recorded "That Summer Something" and "Humidity".

Ocean Sound Band
While a member of Randy Bernsen's Ocean Sound Band in the late 1980s and early 1990s, he recorded tracks on "Paradise Citizens" and "Calling Me Back Home", and performed many concerts internationally, including a billing with Miles Davis.  In 1992, he recorded "Blues Hat Dances 'Round Midnight" with Randy Bernsen and Onorino Tiburzi in Italy.

In 1990, he recorded "Hold Me, Thrill Me, Kiss Me" with Gloria Estefan. For many years, he performed nationwide with Ben Vereen, and appeared with Mr. Vereen with the Atlanta Symphony and the Dallas Symphony.

Active Ingredient
Rucker founded and produced the jazz ensemble Active Ingredient, a group of musicians from the University of Miami.  The band debuted on Bainbridge Records in 1988 with "Building Houses," followed by "Extra Strength" in 1990.

Bee Gees
In 1997, Rucker appeared on a Bee Gees concert at the MGM Grand Las Vegas which was shown on pay-per-view television, HBO, and was mastered as a live album.  The recording of this performance sold over 5 million copies. This led to a world tour of "One Night Only" concerts. The tour included playing to 56,000 people at London's Wembley Stadium on 5 September 1998 and concluded in the newly built Olympic Stadium in Sydney, Australia in March 1999.

Rucker also performed or recorded with Michael Jackson, Paquito D'Rivera, Barry Gibb, Jaco Pastorius, Cliff Richard, Joe Sample, Johnny Cash, Ben Vereen, Bo Diddley, Freda Payne, the Woody Herman Big Band, the Tommy Dorsey Big Band (with Warren Covington), Sam Moore and Bob James.

University of Miami
Since 1979, Rucker has been the Director of Drumset Studies at the University of Miami.  He directs the Funk/Fusion Ensemble, which has won over 20 Downbeat Student Awards. In previous years has created Tower of Power Ensemble and Weather Report Ensembles. Steve also directs the RUCK Ensemble, a hip hop / funk aggregation that features original music by the members of the group.

Late career

In 2008, Rucker created an avant garde duo with guitarist Tom Lippincott.

In 2010, Rucker recorded an album with composer Ron Miller, entitled "Peacock Park the Music of Ron Miller."

Rucker completed an album in 2013 entitled "Conversions" with singer/pianist Hal Roland, in a live jazz quartet configuration.

In 2015, in collaboration with former student Jonathan Joseph, Rucker wrote and published "Exercises in African-American Funk," which contains a set of exercises for developing a fusion of African and American funk drumming elements.

References

External links
Steve Rucker Interview - NAMM Oral History Library (2016)

People from Miami
University of Miami Frost School of Music alumni
Living people
1954 births
People from Charlotte, North Carolina
Berklee College of Music alumni
University of Miami faculty
20th-century American drummers
American male drummers
20th-century American male musicians